Jitřní záře ( Morning Glow in English) is a 2022 Czech television series created under the Voyo Original brand. It was directed by Dan Wlodarczyk, who also co-wrote the screenplay with his wife Hana Wlodarczyk. It premiered on 10 June 2022. It is inspired by real events.

Petra Bučková, Jan Plouhar, Veronika Žilková, Lenka Vlasáková, Pavel Zedníček, Jana Janěková, Halka Třešňáková, Martin Sitta or Denisa Biskupová starred in the series.

Plot 
The story takes place at the beginning of the millennium in a small village in Šumava. Young couple Pavla Junková and Karel Balcar moves there as they wanted to leave the city and finally live on their own, conceive the longed-for child. However living together in a village with neighbors who have different values ​​in life disrupts their dreams. Decision to give their daughter in an unconventional name starts a round of misunderstandings not only within the village, but also within the authorities and the state apparatus. Their eight-month-old daughter is taken from them while media enters the fight for her.

Cast and characters 
 Petra Bučková as Pavla Junková
 Jan Plouhar as Karel Balcar
 Jana Janěková as Jiřina Junková
 Pavel Zedníček as Miroslav Junek
 Veronika Žilková as Mgr. Bohuslava Šnajdrová
 Lenka Dolanská Vlasáková as Ilona
 Sofie Brejchová, Mia Bankó and Denisa Biskupová as Morning Glow/Jitřenka
 Pavel Nový as František Kubín
 Lenka Skopalová as Milena Kubínová
 Karel Zima as Láďa Kubín
 Martin Sitta as MayorRousek
 Halka Třešňáková as Fulínová
 Petra Špindlerová as Věra
 Kristýna Podzimková as Žaneta

References

External links 
 Official page
 

TV Nova (Czech TV channel) original programming
Czech drama television series
2022 Czech television series debuts